Abdulrahman Al-Haddad (born 31 March 1966) is a retired UAE footballer. He played as a centre back for the UAE national football team as well as the Sharjah FC in Sharjah.

Al-Haddad played for the UAE at the 1990 FIFA World Cup finals.

References

1966 births
Living people
Emirati footballers
1990 FIFA World Cup players
1992 AFC Asian Cup players
1996 AFC Asian Cup players
1997 FIFA Confederations Cup players
United Arab Emirates international footballers
UAE Pro League players
Sharjah FC players
Association football defenders
Footballers at the 1994 Asian Games
Asian Games competitors for the United Arab Emirates